The Doniphan Lumber Mill Historic District encompasses an early 20th-century lumber mill in Doniphan, Arkansas, on the eastern outskirts of Searcy.  The district includes eight buildings, most built out of precast concrete, and Doniphan Lake.  The mill was the first large-scale lumber-cutting operation in the county, and its presence was responsible for the growth and development of the community of Doniphan.  The mill is the largest operation of its type in White County.

The district was listed on the National Register of Historic Places in 1991.

See also
National Register of Historic Places listings in White County, Arkansas

References

Historic districts on the National Register of Historic Places in Arkansas
National Register of Historic Places in White County, Arkansas
Concrete buildings and structures
Industrial buildings and structures on the National Register of Historic Places in Arkansas
Sawmills in the United States